Mark Little may refer to:

 Mark Little (Australian actor) (born 1959), Australian actor, television presenter and comedian
 Mark Little (journalist) (born 1968), Irish journalist, television presenter and author
 Mark Little (baseball) (born 1972), former baseball player
 Mark Little (footballer) (born 1988), English footballer
 Mark Little (Gaelic footballer), see Ryan McMenamin
 Mark Little (Canadian comedian), member of the sketch-comedy group Picnicface, based in Halifax, Nova Scotia
 Mark Little, former DJ on Atlantic 252, British Isles

See also
 Mark Littell (born 1953), baseball player